Pentacitrotus quercivorus is a species of moth of the family Tortricidae. It is found in the north-eastern Himalayas.

The wingspan is about 26 mm. The forewings are black with light orange-pinkish markings edged at a short distance with shining violet-metallic lines. The hindwings are yellowish orange, but the anal half is pale ochreous.

The larvae feed on Quercus semicarpifolia.

References

Moths described in 1950
Ceracini